Ain Shams University is a public university located in Cairo, Egypt. Founded in 1950, the university provides education at the undergraduate, graduate and post-graduate levels.

History
Ain Shams University was founded in July 1950, the third-oldest non-sectarian native public Egyptian university (ancient Islamic universities such as Al-Azhar and private institutions such as the American University in Cairo are older), under the name of Ibrahim Pasha's University. Its site used to be a former royal palace, called the Zafarana Palace. The two earlier universities of this kind are Cairo University (Fuad I university formerly) and Alexandria University (Farouk I university formerly). When it was first established, Ain Shams University had a number of faculties and academic institutes, which were later developed into a university.
The university's academic structure includes 14 faculties, 1 college and 2 high institutes plus 12 centers and special units.

Faculties and institutes 
 Faculty of Agriculture (4 years)
 Faculty of Arts
 Faculty of Commerce (4 years)
 Faculty of Computer and Information Science (4 years)
 Faculty of Education (4 years)
 Faculty of Dentistry (6 years)
 Faculty of linguistics (Al Alsun) (4 years)
 Faculty of Law
 Faculty of Medicine (7 years)
 Faculty of Nursing
 Faculty of Pharmacy (6 years) 
 Faculty of Engineering (5 years)
 Faculty of Science (4 years)
 Faculty of Specific Education
 Faculty of Women for Arts, Science and Education.
 Faculty of Archaeology (4 years)
 Institute of Environmental Studies and Research
 Institute of Postgraduate Childhood
 Faculty of Veterinary Medicine The Higher Institute of Cooperative & Managerial Studies

Campuses
Ain Shams University has eight campuses. Two of them are next to each other, separated by a main road named El-Khalifa El-Maamoun; all of them are in Greater Cairo.

The main campus is in Abbassia, Cairo and houses the Administration and Management at the Saffron Palace, Science Education Development Center, Central Library, Child Hood Center and the University City (students hostel), in addition to the faculties of Computer Science, Science, Law and Art.
The opposite Campus houses the faculty of Commerce, Alsun, pharmaceutical Science and Dentistry.

The Women's College has its own campus. Faculty of Specific Education, Faculty of Education, and Faculty of Agriculture are each on separate campuses in Abassia, Heliopolis, and Shubra El Kheima, respectively.

Filming
In 2012, Misr International films was producing a television series based on the novel Zaat by Sonallah Ibrahim. Filming of scenes set at Ain Shams University was scheduled to occur that year, but Muslim Brotherhood student members and some teachers at the school protested, stating that the 1970s era clothing worn by the actresses was indecent and would not allow filming unless the clothing was changed. Gaby Khoury, the head of the film company, stated that engineering department head Sherif Hammad "insisted that the filming should stop and that we would be reimbursed ... explaining that he was not able to guarantee the protection of the materials or the artists."

Rankings

According to the 2014 Webometrics World Universities rankings (aimed to promote Web publication, not to rank institutions), Ain Shams University is ranked 3rd in Egypt, 25th in Arab World and 15th in Africa.

People

Notable faculty
 Mervat Seif el-Din (born 1954), classical archaeologist and former director of the Graeco-Roman Museum
Abd El Aziz Muhammad Hegazi (1923–2014), Prime Minister of Egypt during the presidency of Anwar Sadat
 Abdel Rahman Badawi (1917–2002), professor of philosophy and poet
 Aisha Abd al-Rahman (1913–1998), Egyptian author and professor of literature (pen name: Bint al-Shati)

Notable alumni
 Hani Azer (born 1948), civil engineer
 Charles Butterworth (born 1938), American philosopher
 Farouk El-Baz (born 1938), Space scientist
 Mauro Hamza, fencing coach
 Ekmeleddin İhsanoğlu (born 1943), Turkish academic, politician and diplomat
 Sherif Ismail (born 1955), Prime minister of Egypt
 Emire Khidayer (born 1971), diplomat, entrepreneur and writer
Ahmed Zulfikar (1952-2010), Egyptian entrepreneur
 Ammar El Sherei (1948-2012), Egyptian Composer
 Abdel Latif Moubarak (born 1964), Egyptian poet
 Fathulla Jameel (1942–2012), Minister of Foreign Affairs of Maldives
 Ebrahim Nafae (1934–2018), journalist and newspaper editor
 Sameh Shoukry (born 1952), Ambassador of Egypt to the United States
 Rashad Khalifa (born 1935), biochemist, Founder of the United Submitters International
 Omar Touray (born 1965), Gambian diplomat
 Farouk al-Fishawy (1952–2019), Egyptian actor
Kenan Yaghi, current Finance Minister of Syria
Jamal Badawi, preacher and speaker on Islam
Taha El Sherif Ben Amer, Minister of Transport of Libya

Photo gallery

See also
 Education in Egypt
 Egyptian universities
 List of Egyptian universities

References

External links 

Ain Shams University official web site

 
Educational institutions established in 1950
1950 establishments in Egypt
Buildings and structures in Cairo